The 2022 Canoe Marathon European Championships took place from 28 to 31 July 2022 in Silkeborg, Denmark.

Schedule
All times are local time (Central European Summer Time).

Medalists

Senior

Under 23

Junior

Medal table

Participants
A total of 233 canoeists from the national teams of the following 17 countries was registered to compete at 2022 Canoe Marathon European Championships.

 (3)
 (5)
 (5)
 (25)
 (11)
 (16)
 (15)
 (33)
 (8)
 (2)
 (11)
 (7)
 (12)
 (1)
 (44)
 (11)
 (24)

References

External links
European Canoe Association
Results

Canoe Marathon European Championships
Canoe Marathon
International sports competitions hosted by Denmark
European Championships Canoe Marathon
Canoeing in Denmark
Sport in Silkeborg